Odites homocirrha is a moth in the family Depressariidae. It was described by Alexey Diakonoff in 1968. It is found on Luzon in the Philippines.

References

Moths described in 1968
Odites